Cottage Industries Exposition Limited (CIE) is a multinational company that sells carpets, handicrafts and other heritage items from India and the Middle East. 	

Cottage Industries Exposition Ltd was established in 1978 as an export-trading house.

Beyond the Indian shores, this concern for heritage is sustained by establishing emporia in Thailand, Mauritius, Indonesia, Cambodia, Africa, the Middle East, United Kingdom and the United States provide an opportunity not only to view and share the Indian heritage from the days gone by but also provide an opportunity to purchase items such as carpets, Pashmina shawls, silk, gilded artifacts, reproductions of Islamic art and miniatures. 
Bill Clinton, Madeleine Albright, Carl Lewis, Bill Gates, Madonna & Paul McCartney have all been CIE clients.

Group Companies
 Cottage Industries Exposition Limited
 SAGA Department Stores Limited
 SAGA World Dubai
 Miraj Islamic Art Centre Dubai

References

Retail companies of India